Dondersia is a genus of pholidoskepian solenogasters, a kind of shell-less, worm-like mollusk.

References

Pholidoskepia